Love conquers all (Latin:  or ) may refer to:

Latin form
 omnia vincit amor, a Latin phrase from Eclogue X by Virgil
 “Amor vincit omnia” is the motto written on a brooch belonging to Madam Eglantine, the Prioress in Geoffrey Chaucer’s Canterbury Tales, some of the earliest surviving English literature
 Amor Vincit Omnia (Caravaggio), a 1601–1602 painting by Caravaggio
 Amor Vincit Omnia, a 2009 album by Draco Rosa
 Amor Vincit Omnia (album), a 2009 album by Pure Reason Revolution

English form
 Love Conquers All, a novel by Fred Saberhagen
 Love Conquers All, a 1922 compilation by Robert Benchley
 Love Conquers All (1934 film), a 1934 German film
 Love Conquers All (2006 film), a 2006 Malaysian film by Tan Chui Mui
 Love Conquers All, the name of a specific edit of Terry Gilliam's 1985 film Brazil
 Love Conquers All (album), an album by Michael Wycoff
 Love Conquers All, a 1992 album by Radio Werewolf
 "Love Conquers All" (ABC song), 1991
 "Love Conquers All", a song by Deep Purple from their 1990 album Slaves and Masters
 "Love Conquers All", a song by Yes from their 1991 album Yesyears

See also
"Love Will Conquer All", a 1986 song by Lionel Richie